Josef Dvorník (born 23 April 1978 in Přílepy) is a former Czech football player. He played most of his career in Gambrinus liga teams.

Honours
With Baník Ostrava:
 Gambrinus liga: 2003/04
 Czech Cup: 2004/05

References
 Profile at iDNES.cz
 Guardian Football

Czech footballers
Czech expatriate footballers
FC Fastav Zlín players
FC Baník Ostrava players
FC Zbrojovka Brno players
FK Baník Sokolov players
SFC Opava players
MFK Ružomberok players
Manisaspor footballers
Slovak Super Liga players
Czech First League players
Süper Lig players
Expatriate footballers in Slovakia
Expatriate footballers in Turkey
Czech expatriate sportspeople in Slovakia
Czech expatriate sportspeople in Turkey
Living people
1978 births
Association football defenders
People from Přílepy (Kroměříž District)
Sportspeople from the Zlín Region